Baron Davies, of Llandinam in the County of Montgomery, is a title in the Peerage of the United Kingdom. It was created in 1932 for the Welsh businessman, Liberal Member of Parliament and philanthropist, David Davies. He was the grandson and namesake of the prominent industrialist David Davies Llandinam.

The second Baron Davies was the son of the first Baron and his first wife, Amy, daughter of L. T. Penman. He married Ruth, daughter of Major William Marshall Dugdale, in 1939. They had two sons. Lord Davies fought in the Second World War as a major in the Royal Welch Fusiliers and was killed on the Western Front in September 1944, aged 29, only three months after succeeding his father in the barony. His three-year-old eldest son, David, inherited the barony shortly before his fourth birthday.

Barons Davies (1932)
David Davies, 1st Baron Davies (1880–1944)
David Davies, 2nd Baron Davies (16 January 1915 –  25 September 1944) 
David Davies, 3rd Baron Davies (b. 1940)

The heir apparent is the present holder's son Hon. David Daniel Davies (b. 1975).

Arms

References

Baronies in the Peerage of the United Kingdom
Noble titles created in 1932
Noble titles created for UK MPs